Wycliffe Juma Oluoch (born 6 May 1980) is a Kenyan football defender who last played for FK Mjølner. He has been capped twice.

References

1980 births
Living people
Footballers from Nairobi
Kenyan footballers
Association football defenders
Mathare United F.C. players
Løv-Ham Fotball players
Nybergsund IL players
FK Mjølner players
Kenya international footballers
Kenyan expatriate footballers
Kenyan expatriate sportspeople in Norway
Expatriate footballers in Norway